Events in the year 1908 in Norway.

Incumbents
Monarch – Haakon VII

Events

Popular culture

Sports

26 September – SK Brann football club is founded.
Football Association of Norway joins FIFA.

Music

Film

Literature
 The Knut Hamsund novels Benoni and Rosa: Af Student Parelius' Papirer, was published.
 The Olav Duun novel Marjane was published.

Births

January to March
22 January – Kåre Hatten, cross-country skier (died 1983).
3 February – Ragna Johanne Forsberg, politician (died 1984)
3 February – Oddbjørn Hagen, skier, Olympic gold medallist and World Champion (died 1983)
4 February – Ellisiv Steen, literary scholar (d. 2001).
26 February – Einar Hovdhaugen, politician (died 1996)
15 March – Sverre Kolterud, Nordic combined skier (died 1996)
17 March – Oscar Christian Gundersen, politician and Minister (died 1991)
28 March – Hans Engnestangen, speed skater and World Champion (died 2003)

April to June
9 April – Odd Bang-Hansen, novelist and children's writer (died 1984)
10 April – Oskar Steinvik, politician (died 1975)
21 April – Nic. Stang, art historian and writer (died 1971)
24 April – Jonas Enge, politician (died 1981)
9 May – Lars Mathias Hille Esmark, civil servant and business person in the tourist industry (died 1998).
2 June – Michael Staksrud, speed skater and World Champion (died 1940)
6 June – Bjarne Eilif Thorvik, politician (died 1972)
19 June – Leo Tallaksen, politician (died 1983)
21 June – Erik Brofoss, economist, politician and Minister (died 1979)
28 June – Nini Haslund Gleditsch, political activist and advocate for peace (died 1996).
28 June – Olav Reiersøl, statistician and econometrician (died 2001)
29 June – Arne Berge, priest. 
30 June – Thor Myklebust, politician (died 1989)

July to September
1 August – Gidsken Jakobsen, aviation pioneer (died 1990)
6 August – Arthur Klæbo, journalist (died 1985).
13 August – Nils Kristen Jacobsen, politician (died 1993)
17 August – Harald Selås, politician (died 1986)
18 August – Olav H. Hauge, poet (died 1994)
19 August – Birger Haug, high jumper (died 1981)
22 August – Synnøve Lie, speed skater (died 1980)
2 September – Olaf Hoffsbakken, Nordic skier, Olympic silver medallist and World Champion (died 1986).
23 September – Oscar Olsen, politician (died 2004)
24 September – Hans Borgen, politician (died 1983)

October to December
19 October – Geirr Tveitt, composer and pianist (died 1981)
4 November – Olaf Fredrik Watnebryn, politician (died 1977)
1 December – Torstein Olav Kuvaas, politician (died 1996)
8 December – Synnøve Anker Aurdal, textile artist (died 2000).
31 December – Carl Fredrik Wisløff, theologian and Christian preacher (died 2004)

Full date unknown
Reidar Carlsen, politician and Minister (died 1987)
Helmer Dahl, engineer (died 1999)
Jens E. Ekornes, businessperson (died 1976)
Nils Johan Rud, novelist, short story writer and magazine editor (died 1993)
Rolf Ingvar Semmingsen, civil servant (died 1979)
Oskar Skogly, politician and Minister (died 1988)

Deaths

28 January – Ragnhild Jølsen, author (born 1875)
13 April – Aasta Hansteen, painter, writer, and early feminist (born 1824)
2 June – Aimar August Sørenssen, politician and Minister (born 1823)
5 July – Jonas Lie, novelist (born 1833)
2 August – Jørgen Breder Faye, banker and politician (born 1823)
27 November – Knud Bergslien, painter and teacher (born 1827)

Full date unknown
Lars Christian Dahll, politician and Minister (born 1823)
Einar Løchen, jurist and politician (born 1850)

See also

References

External links

 
Norway
Norway